The 2019–20 season of the Turkish Women's First Football League is the 24th season of Turkey's premier women's football league. 

The league season started with the first week matches on 20 October 2019, and the regular season will conclude with the 22nd week matches on 3 May 2020. The number of participating teams was increased from ten to twelve again after eight seasons. Trabzon İdmanocağı was relegated after the previous season due to not show-up. The promoted Women's Second League teams are Adana İdmanyurduspor of Adana, Fomget Gençlik ve Spor from Ankara and Kocaeli Bayan FK of İzmit.  Four teams from Istanbul continue to take part in the 2019–20 season.

On 19 March 2020, Youth and Sports Minister Mehmet Kasapoğlu announced that following a meeting with the federation presidents all men's and women's football, basketball, volleyball and handball leagues were postponed as part of the precautionary measures taken in context with the COVID-19 pandemic in Turkey.

On 8 July 2020, the Turkish Football Federation's board of directors decided that the 2019-20 "Özge Kanbay Season" matches of all three women's football leagues not to be played further due to the COVİD-19 outbreak in Turkey. The following decisions were made for the 2019-20 Turkish Women's First Football League season:
a) The League is registered according to the current score ranking on the date when it was decided not to be played
b) No champion team is declared
c) No relegation of teams to the Turkish Women's Second Football League will take place
d) No prizes will be awarded to the champion, runner-up and the third placed teams
e) ALG Spor, which ranked at the top of the league according to the current ranking, represented Turkey at the 2020–21 UEFA Women's Champions League

Teams

Team changes

League table

Results

Top goalscorers

.

Hat-tricks and more

References

2019
2019–20 domestic women's association football leagues
Women's First League
Turkish Women's First Football League, 2019-20